This is a list of members of the Victorian Legislative Assembly from 1927 to 1929, as elected at the 1927 state election:

 On 2 November 1927, the Independent member for Gippsland South, Henry Bodman, died. Nationalist candidate and former member Walter West won the resulting by-election on 3 December 1927.
 On 16 March 1928, the Nationalist member for Brighton and Speaker of the Assembly, Oswald Snowball, died. Nationalist candidate Ian Macfarlan won the resulting by-election on 28 April 1928.
 In October 1928, the Nationalist member for Castlemaine and Kyneton, former Premier Harry Lawson, resigned to contest a Senate seat at the 1928 federal election. Nationalist candidate Walter Langslow won the resulting by-election on 2 February 1929.
 On 8 June 1929, the Nationalist member for Barwon, Edward Morley, died. Nationalist candidate Thomas Maltby won the resulting by-election on 6 July 1929.
 In September 1929, the Country member for Gippsland West, Arthur Walter, resigned to contest Division of Indi in the 1929 federal election. Country candidate Matthew Bennett won the resulting by-election on 19 October 1929.

Sources
 Re-member (a database of all Victorian MPs since 1851). Parliament of Victoria.

Members of the Parliament of Victoria by term
20th-century Australian politicians